The 2001 Mercedes Cup was a men's tennis tournament played on outdoor clay courts at the Tennis Club Weissenhof in Stuttgart, Germany and was part of the International Series Gold of the 2001 ATP Tour. The tournament was held from 16 July until 22 July 2001. First-seeded Gustavo Kuerten won the singles title.

Finals

Singles

 Gustavo Kuerten defeated  Guillermo Cañas 6–3, 6–2, 6–4
 It was Kuerten's 6th title of the year and the 23rd of his career.

Doubles

 Guillermo Cañas /  Rainer Schüttler defeated  Michael Hill /  Jeff Tarango 4–6, 7–6(7–1), 6–4
 It was Cañas' 2nd title of the year and the 3rd of his career. It was Schüttler's 1st title of the year and the 2nd of his career.

References

External links
  
 ITF tournament edition details
 ATP tournament profile

Stuttgart Open
Stuttgart Open
2001 in German tennis